The Journal of Global Security Studies is a peer-reviewed academic journal which aims to publish first-rate work addressing the variety of methodological, epistemological, theoretical, normative, and empirical concerns reflected in the field of global security studies, encouraging dialogue, engagement, and conversation between different parts of the field. 
It is published by Oxford University Press on behalf of the International Studies Association.
The current editors in chief are Asaf Siniver and Jamie Gaskarth.

References

External links
Official website

International relations journals
International security
English-language journals
Quarterly journals